Aïssa Maïga (born 5 May 1975) is a Senegal-born French actress, director, writer, producer, and activist. Maïga has worked with major auteurs like Michael Haneke, Abderrahmane Sissako and Michel Gondry, and recently starred in Chiwetel Ejiofor’s directorial debut.

Maïga is an advocate for inclusion and has been vocal about racial discrimination in the film industry throughout her career. Maïga was inspired to speak out and create the DiasporAct collective after realising she was often the sole performer of colour to receive top billing and awards season attention—despite the abundance of diverse talent around her.

Early life 
Maïga was born in Dakar, Senegal to a Malian father and Senegalese mother. Maïga grew up in Dakar but would go to Mali on holidays as a child to spend time with her grandmother, uncles, aunts, and cousins. Her family comes from a small town in the region of Gao—near the Sahara desert—and her father is of the Songhay people.

She moved to France when she was 4 years old to live with her aunt and uncle. Her father, Mohamed Maïga was murdered in 1987, a few months before the Head of State in Burkina Faso was killed in a coup.

Career

Career beginnings (1996-2005) 
Maïga landed a role alongside Yvan Attal in Denis Amart's Saraka Bô (1996), her acting was well received and she went on to play a rebellious young girl in Michael Haneke's Code Unknown (2000) and his later film Caché (2005). Her work in Cédric Klapisch's Russian Dolls (2005) cemented her role as a notable performer in French cinema.

Bamako and career breakthrough (2005-2011) 
Maïga was nominated for a César Award for Most Promising Actress for her role in Abderrahmane Sissako’s Malian drama Bamako (2006) and became the first French actress of African descent to ever receive a nomination, thereby becoming the most visible black actress working in France. That same year, an anthology film called Paris, je t’aime (2006) was also premiered at Cannes and Maïga was the female lead in the short film directed by South African filmmaker Oliver Schmitz. Maïga was joined on the Cannes red carpet by Oliver Schmitz and producer Danny Glover.

Bianco e nero (2008) starring Maïga and Favio Volo was the first successful and mainstream Italian film to tackle interracial romance. In 2009, Maïga won Best Actress for Bianco e nero (2008) at the Festival du Cinema Italien de Bastia.

Rise to stardom and international career (2012—present) 
Maïga starred alongside Audrey Tatou and Romain Duris in Michel Gondry's surreal and whimsical Mood Indigo (2014). In 2016, Maïga starred in the Netflix film The African Doctor (2016) alongside Democratic Republic of the Congo actor Marc Zinga.

In 2018, Maïga premiered in the Irish RTÉ crime series Taken Down (2018—present) written by Stuart Carolan and her role was received with critical acclaim.

Maïga co-starred with Chiwetel Ejiofor in his joint film with Netflix set during the Malawian food crisis in the 2000s, The Boy Who Harnessed the Wind (2019). She was the lead female character—Agnes Kamkwamba—and the film premiered at the Sundance Film Festival and was added to Netflix on March 1, 2019.

Political activism 
Maïga is a leading figure in a new wave of activism by people of colour in French cinema in response to the lack of black representation in French films. The few roles available in the industry for black actors and actresses are usually racial stereotypes and Maïga uses her platform to challenge this and encourage change.

DiasporAct collective 
Maïga has collaborated with fifteen other black actresses and French personalities to create the DiasporAct collective. The group consists of Maïga, Nadège Beausson-Diagne, Mata Gabin, Maïmouna Gueye, Eye Haïdara, Rachel Khan, Sara Martins, Marie-Philomène Nga, Sabine Pakora, Firmine Richard, Sonia Rolland, Magaajyia Silberfeld, Shirley Souagnon, Assa Sylla, Karidja Touré, and France Zobda.

DiasporAct book 'Black is Not My Job' 
Before Maïga went to Malawi in 2017 to film Chiwetel Ejiofor’s adaptation of The Boy Who Harnessed the Wind (2019), Maïga wrote the essay that would become the book's forward. Once the filming was over, she dedicated herself to the book and contacted a group of performers to bring many perspectives to the project.“I’ve often asked myself why I’m one of the only black actresses to work in a country as racially mixed as France.”—Aïssa Maïga, Black is Not My JobThe DiasporAct group published a book called Noire n’est pas mon métier (which means 'Black is not my job') (ed. Seuil). The essays in this book featured a response to the lack of representation and inclusion that black actresses face in French cinema, as well as the stereotypical portrayal of black people whenever they are included. The book details the inequity and racism black women face in the French film industry and outlines personal stories and casting experiences specific to black actresses, and came to fruition amid the #MeToo movement and the Cannes festival that had a wave of calls for inclusion.

The book was a success in France and has sparked debate about minority representation, and with these newly opened doors the group has aimed to continue to spread the message to combat racism within the French film industry and media.

DiasporAct red carpet anti-racism protest at Cannes 
Maïga and the DiasporAct collective held a peaceful anti-racism protest as they went into the premiere of Lee Chang-dong's FIPRESCI Prize–winning film, Burning at the 71st Annual Cannes Film Festival in 2018. The group of women stood at the top of the red carpet steps at the festival and raised their fists while dancing joyously to the Rihanna song Diamonds to protest the racial bias and discrimination that is rampant within the French film industry. During a press conference that featured the group, Maïga told Agence France-Presse that setting up a racial quota in the French film industry is a potential option for combating the lack of onscreen diversity, and acknowledged that this could spark strong opposition in France. All members of the group wore matching black and white ensembles created by Balmain's mixed-race designer Olivier Rousteing who told Vogue:“I think we are really at a huge turning point in every industry, whether film, or fashion, or music. We are living in a world where we are trying to break from the past and define what we want from the future. I believe in the power of women, I have since I was a little boy, and this moment means a lot to me.”The clear message of the protest, combined with the recently released book to back it up, was met positively—the consequent media reports talked of their beauty, style and courage—and the group hope that the industry will continue to evolve to be more inclusive.

2020 César awards 
Maïga and 30 fellow actors of colour all spoke out against the lack of diversity among those nominated for a 2020 César award in an open letter entitled '#BlackCesars' that was published just before the awards ceremony. The intention of the open letter was to shed light on the absence of Black, Arab, and Asian performers and filmmakers in the nominations for the event.

On the night of the 45th César awards, Maïga gave a speech calling out the lack of diversity in French cinema. The speech was unexpected and contrasted with the congratulatory speeches that had taken place throughout the evening, the predominantly white audience of the "French Oscars" were all frozen in silent surprise and discomfort. Maïga began her speech by greeting the 12 black people (out of the 1,600 guests) and proceeded to outline the ways in which black people and their stories are systemically ignored in French media, TV, and cinema."We survived whitewashing, blackface, tonnes of dealer roles, housekeepers with a Bwana accent, we survived the roles of terrorists, all the roles of hypersexualised girls...but we are not going to leave French cinema alone."—Aïssa Maïga, 2020 César awardsWhen Roman Polanski was awarded Best Director later in the ceremony, Maïga walked out along with Adèle Haenel to join the protestors outside the awards ceremony who were chanting "Polanski is a rapist".

Philanthropy 
Maïga was an ambassador for AMREF's Stand Up for African Mothers Campaign (SU4AM). In 2013 AMREF Africa organised a trip for French SU4AM ambassadors to visit Uganda for events in collaboration with French midwives to support their colleagues in Africa. Here Maïga (along with singer Zazie, international fencing champion Laura Flessel, former midwife Mathilde de Calan who works at the French Ministry of Foreign Affairs, and AMREF France's Haweya Mohamed) met Ugandan midwife Esther Madudu at the Katine Health Centre, took part in an outreach mission, and visited the Masaka School of Midwifery and Comprehensive Nursing in Kampala and the Tiriri Health Centre IV in Soroti.

Personal life 
Vogue cites Maïga as their “French style crush” and says she has “never once disappointed”, Maïga challenges the “just rolled out of bed” Parisian style and opts for a look that is glamorous and elegant.

Theater

Filmography

Film

As actress

As director

Television

References

External links

1975 births
Living people
People from Dakar
Senegalese people of Malian descent
Senegalese film actresses
French people of Malian descent
French people of Senegalese descent
French film actresses
Senegalese emigrants to France
21st-century French actresses
French television actresses
Knights of the Ordre national du Mérite
Chevaliers of the Ordre des Arts et des Lettres